Kane Gregory Churko (born January 20, 1986) is a Canadian record producer, sound engineer, songwriter and musician best known for his work with artists such as Ozzy Osbourne, Papa Roach, Cory Marks, Modern Science, Five Finger Death Punch, Gemini Syndrome, In This Moment, and Hellyeah.

Career 
Kane Churko (son and protege of producer Kevin Churko) has written songs for some of rock's biggest names including Ozzy Osbourne, Five Finger Death Punch, In This Moment, Jake E. Lee's Red Dragon Cartel and more Canadian born but Las Vegas based and currently working out of the Hideout Recording Studio in Henderson, Nevada, Kane has been actively working in many roles in recording studios and the music business since he was 14.

Kane grew up in a musical family with no formal training other than the professional guidance of his father and the experiences he has gained working with a broad range of people from an early age.  A multi-instrumentalist, programmer and Pro Tools user he has also worked with producers Mutt Lange and Eric Valentine as well as an eclectic range of popular artists such as Bob Dylan, Shania Twain, Maroon 5, Smash Mouth, Hinder and The Corrs.

The first time he co-wrote a rock song for a release it was featured on Ozzy Osbourne's 10th studio album "Scream" which debuted at #4 on the Billboard album charts – selling over 375k albums. The second rock cut he co-wrote was with Five Finger Death Punch for their third gold album "American Capitalist" which peaked at #2 on the Billboard Hard Rock album charts. Despite being their first collaboration "Remember Everything" went on to sell over 325k singles peaking on the Billboard's Mainstream Rock Songs radio charts at #2. The third time he wrote a rock song was with In This Moment for "Blood" – a breakout track for the band which has become Century Media's best selling single pushing over 275k singles of "Blood" and peaking at #9 on the Active Rock radio chart.

Awards and achievements 
Kane was recognized by the industry in 2013 when he became the youngest person to win the Juno Award (Canada's version of the Grammys) for "Engineer of the Year" for his work on In This Moment's "Blood"/Five Finger Death Punch's "Coming Down" narrowly beating Bob Rock who held the record for 31 years before him.  He shared the award (as well as a second producer nomination) with his father, who also set a record that year for winning the engineer award the most number of times with his 4th win. In 2015, Kane achieved his first #1Active Rock song as co-writer, producer, engineer and mixer of "Face Everything And Rise" by Papa Roach. He has also been the frontman/songwriter for Juno nominated pop/funk band Modern Science since 2007 also releasing a diverse range of solo material since the early 2000s as Mr.Kane. He's co-written/co-produced two breakout tracks for 9 year old rapper MattyB with both YouTube videos garnering over 5 million views each. His sonic brand of industrial pop has featured on officially commissioned remixes featuring 5FDP, In This Moment, Rob Zombie and Tech9.

Credits 
Velvet Chains - Morbid Dreams (October 2022)
 Producer, Co-Writer, Engineer, Mixer & Masterer on 3 Songs "Last Drop", "Can’t Win", "Time Stood Still".
Cory Marks – Who I Am (August 2020)
co-producer, songwriter
Santa Cruz – Katharsis (October 2019)
producer, composer.
Memphis May Fire – Broken (November 2018)
producer, composer.
Vamps – Underworld (April 2017)
Produced, co-wrote eight songs
Skillet – Unleashed (August 2016)
Co-wrote "Out of Hell" and "Undefeated"
Gemini Syndrome – Memento Mori (August 2016)
Produced, engineered & mixed album and co-wrote "Eternity" and select tracks.
9ELECTRIC – The Damaged Ones (July 2016)
Co-produced, mixed, additional engineering, & mastered album and co-wrote "Toxic Angel"
Disturbed – Immortalized (Aug 2015)
Engineering, Pro Tools
Five Finger Death Punch – Got Your Six (Sept 2015)
Engineering, Pro Tools
Papa Roach – F.E.A.R. (Jan 2015)
Producer, Co-Writer, Engineer, Mixer & Masterer On 7 Songs "Face Everything And Rise", "Love Me Till It Hurts", "Falling Apart", *"Never Have To Say Goodbye", "Devil", "Warriors", "Hope For The Hopeless".  Co-Engineer, Additional Programming On The Rest Of The Album.
In This Moment – Black Widow (Nov 2014)
Co-Wrote "Bloody Creature Poster Girl" &"Bones", Additional Engineering
Art of Dying – Rise Up EP (April 2015)
Produced, Mixed & Engineered The Song "Everything"
One Ok Rock – Ambitions (2017)
Produced, Cowrote, Mixed, Engineered Two Songs.
Bleeker – Ep (April 2016)
Mixed "Highway", Background Vocals, Additional Programming & Percussion
Escape The Fate – Hate Me (Oct 2015)
Co-Wrote "Breaking Me Down"
Falling In Reverse – Tba (2016 Tba)
Co-Wrote One Track
Flyleaf – Between The Stars (Sept 2014)
Mixed & Mastered "Set Me On Fire (Radio Mix)" & Thread (Radio Mix)
New Years Day – Malevolence (2015)
Co-Wrote "Suffer"
Otherwise – Peace At All Costs (Sept 2014)
Co-Wrote Two Tracks "Coming For The Throne" &"The Other Side Of The Truth"
Grimsley Rose – Truth To Power Ep (Aug 2014)
Mastered
3Align – Elevate (July 2014)
Mixed & Mastered, Vocal Production, Co-Wrote "In The Beyond", "Feel Love" &"Little Bit Better"
Hellyeah – Blood For Blood (June 2014)
Additional Engineering, Pro Tools
Chiodos – Devil (April 2014)
Co-Wrote "Under Your Halo"
Gus G. - I Am The Fire (March 2014)
Co-Wrote "Long Way Down Featuring Alexia Rodriguez From Eyes Set To Kill"
In This Moment – Blood Live At The Orpheum DVD (Feb 2014)
Co-Wrote "Blood" &"Beast Within", Assistant Mixing, Pro Tools
Jake E. Lee's Red Dragon Cartel – Red Dragon Cartel (Jan 2014)
Co-wrote "Big Mouth", "Feeder", "Deceived", "Slave" and "War Machine"
Five Finger Death Punch – The Wrong Side of Heaven and the Righteous Side of Hell, Volume 2 (Nov 2013)
Co-wrote "A Day In My Life", additional engineering, Pro Tools, remixer, mixed and mastered live DVD audio on bonus disc.
Gemini Syndrome – Lux (Sept 2013)
Additional engineering, Pro Tools
Eyes Set to Kill – Masks (Sept 2013)
Co-wrote "Haze" and "Infected"
Five Finger Death Punch – The Wrong Side of Heaven and the Righteous Side of Hell, Volume 1 (July 2013)
Co-wrote "M.I.N.E (End This Way)", additional engineering, Pro Tools
Five Finger Death Punch – Purgatory (Tales from the Pit) (July 2013)
Mixed and mastered entire live album, co-wrote "Remember Everything"
Butcher Babies – Goliath (2013)
Co-wrote two unreleased tracks
Rob Zombie – Venomous Rat Regeneration Vendor (2013)
Mix assistant, assistant mastering
Heavy Honey – Crushing Symphony (2014)
Mixed and mastered entire album, vocal production on select tracks, produced and engineered "Soul Selling"
Speaking the King's – Carousel (2015)
Co-wrote "Choke" and "Worthless"
Jason Hook – American Justice (2015)
Mixing, additional production, mastering Heavy Honey – Crushing Symphony (2014)
Mixed and mastered entire album, vocal production on select tracks, produced and engineered "Soul Selling"
Billy J White – Damn Fool Thing to Do (2014)
Mixed, mastered
Chris Buck Band – Buck Wild (2014)
Mixed and mastered "Caribbean Dream" and "Ain't No Trouble"
In This Moment – Blood (2012)
Co-wrote "Blood", "You're Gonna Listen", "Beast Within", "Comanche", engineer, programming and additional production, assistant mastering, additional guitar on "Whore", remixed "Adrenalize (Mr. Kane Remix)"
Kobra and the Lotus – Kobra and the Lotus (2012)
Co-wrote "Forever One", Co-producer on 4 tracks, additional engineering, Pro Tools, assistant mastering
Conflict of Interest – Conflict of Interest EP (2012)
Co-wrote and co-produced "No Pain No Pleasure", Pro Tools, programming
Arising Tide – Arising Tide EP (2012)
Mixed "Guns In This Town", "Fire", "Move Along", mastered entire EP
The Dirty Hooks – Electric Grit (2012)
Mixed, mastered
Five Finger Death Punch – American Capitalist (Deluxe Edition) (2011)
Co-wrote "Remember Everything", 2nd engineer, remixed "Under And Over It", "The Pride", "100 Ways to Hate" and "Remember Everything"
Modern Science – How the World Ends EP (2011)
Producer, writer, engineer, performer, label
Emerson Drive – Let Your Love Speak (2011)
Additional engineering, Pro Tools
Hinder – All American Nightmare (2010)
Additional engineering, Pro Tools
Ozzy Osbourne – Scream (2010)
Co-wrote "Crucify", additional engineering, Pro Tools
In This Moment – A Star-Crossed Wasteland (2010)
Assistant engineer, Pro Tools
Five Finger Death Punch – War Is the Answer (2009)
Assistant engineer, Pro Tools
Modern Science – Modern Science (2009)
Producer, writer, engineer, performer, label
Scott Leigh – Scott Leigh (2009)
Co-writer, co-producer
Drive A – Loss of Desire (2009)
Pro Tools
Simon Collins – U-Catastrophe (2008)
Pro Tools
In This Moment – The Dream (2008)
Pro Tools
Ozzy Osbourne – Black Rain (2008)
Pro Tools, acoustic guitar on "Lay Your World on Me"
Patricia Conroy – Talking to Myself (2007)
Pro Tools
Mr. Kane – Mr. Kane (2007)
Producer, writer, engineer, performer, label
Bob Dylan – Modern Times (2006)
Additional engineering on "Thunder on the Mountain"
JParis – Call It What You Want (2005)
Pro Tools
Lorenzo – Love Shape Bruise (2005)
Pro Tools
Cardinal Trait – You Already Know (2004)

Mix assistant 
SHANIA TWAIN – UP CLOSE & PERSONAL DVD (2004)
Pro Tools Engineering
JENNA DREY – JENNARATION JUST LIKE THAT (2004)
Pro Tools, Additional programming on Motorocycle
THE CORRS – BORROWED HEAVEN (2004)
Additional Pro Tools Editing
THE F-UPS – THE F-UPS (2004)
Pro Tools
THE VINES – AOL SESSIONS LIVE (2004)
Pro Tools
MELISSA AUF DER MAUR – AUF DER MAUR (2004)
Pro Tools
BRAD JOHNER – FREE (2003)
Mix Assistant & Pro Tools on Free, Different, The Farmer's Back

Single songs 
Matty B – Turn Up The Track (Feb 2015)
Co-Producer, Co-Writer, Engineer, Mixer, Masterer
Rob & Pure Joy – Catches Up To You (2014 Tba)
Co-Writer, Produce, Engineer, Mixer, Masterer
Two Shine County – Whole Lotta Love (Aug 2014)
Mixed & Mastered "Whole Lotta Love"
Cory Marquardt – Smartphone (Sept 2014)
Mixed & Mastered "Smartphone"
Brad Saunders – Hey Country Girl & Here With Me (2014)
Mixed & Mastered "Hey Country Girl" &"Here With Me"
Shannon Ramirez – Sugardrop
Mixed & Mastered "Sugardrop"
Rev Theory – Red Light Queen (Feb 2014)
Mixed Song "Red Light Queen"
Wintergarden – Breathe (Featuring Clint Lowery) (Dec 2013)
Mixed, Mastered
Lorenzo – Not Ready To Say I'M Sorry Yet (2012)
Mixed, Masterer
In This Moment – Blood (2012)
Co-Writer #1 iTunes Metal Charts, #5 iTunes Rock Charts, #9 Active Rock Radio Charts And Still Rising Video Has Over 8 Million *Views! Best Selling Single In Century Media'S History.  Over 275K Singles Sold.
Five Finger Death Punch – Remember Everything (2011/2012)
Co-Writer  [Peaked At #2 On Active Rock Radio], Album Sold Over 500K Copies.  Over 325K Singles Sold.
Matty B – Be Right There (2012)
Co-Writer, Co-Producer [Over 6 Million Views On YouTube]
Matty B – That'S The Way (2012)
Co-Writer, Co-Producer  [Over 6 Million Views On YouTube + #9 Billboard Social 50]
Sherry St.Germain – Gonna Getchya (2012)
Co-Writer, Co-Producer, Mixer, Master, Label [Featured In Degrassi]
Heavy Honey – Soul Selling (2012)
Producer, Engineer, Mixer, Master
Nikka Bling & Modern Science – Hippie & A Thug (2010)
Producer, Cowriter, Engineer, Mixer, Label
Meaghan Martin – Hate You (2010)
Co-Producer, Co-Writer, Label
Modern Science Feat. Del The Funky Homosapien – Do It Right Now (2010)
Producer, Writer, Engineer, Performer, Label
Modern Science – Someday (2010)
Producer, Writer, Engineer, Performer, Label
Modern Science – Shake Your Money Maker (2010)
Producer, Writer, Engineer, Performer, Label
Modern Science – Funky Xmas (2009)
Producer, Writer, Engineer, Performer, Label
Nikka Bling – Believe Me I Know (2009)
Producer, Engineer, Mixer
Juliet Simms – Say [Unreleased Demo] (2006)
Co-Writer, Producer
Maroon 5 – Until You'Re Over Me (Unreleased Eric Valentine Produced B-Side) (2006)
Assistant Engineer, Pro Tools
Smash Mouth – Getting Better From The Cat In The Hat Ost (2004)
Assistant Engineer, Pro Tools

Remixes 
In This Moment – Sick Like Me (Mr. Kane & Nikka Bling Remix) (2015)
Five Finger Death Punch – House Of The Rising Sun (Mr.Kane & Nikka Bling Remix) (Tba 2014)
Five Finger Death Punch – Burn Mf (Mr.Kane & Nikka Bling Remix) (Tba 2014)
Five Finger Death Punch – You (Mr.Kane & Nikka Bling Remix) (Tba 2014)
Five Finger Death Punch – Mama Said Knock You Out (Mr.Kane & Nikka Bling Remix) (Tba 2014)
Noah Silver – Poolhall (Mr. Kane Remix) (2013)
For King And Country – Proof Of Your Love (Mr. Kane Remix) (2013 Unreleased)
In This Moment – Adrenalize (Mr. Kane Remix) (2013)
Mattyb – That'S The Way (Dubstep Remix) (2012) [Over 600K Views On YouTube]
Five Finger Death Punch – Remember Everything (Mr.Kane & The Wolfe Remix) (2011)
Five Finger Death Punch – The Pride (Mr.Kane & The Wolfe Remix) (2011)
Five Finger Death Punch – 100 Ways To Hate (Mr.Kane & The Wolfe Remix) (2011)
Five Finger Death Punch – Under And Over It (Mr.Kane & The Wolfe Remix)  (2011)
Noah Silver – Glory, Oh So Sweet&Retro Girl (Modern Science Remix) (2010)
Snoop Dogg Feat. Kid Cudi – That Tree (Modern Science Remix) (2010)
Weezer – Love Is The Answer (Modern Science Remix) (2010)

References 

1986 births
Living people
Canadian songwriters
Canadian record producers
Musicians from Regina, Saskatchewan